The Combined Raw Materials Board was a temporary World War II government agency that allocated the combined economic resources of the United States and Britain.  It was set up by President Franklin D. Roosevelt and Prime Minister Winston Churchill on January 26, 1942.  Later Canada
participated as an associated member in many of the Board's decisions.

Rosen finds that the Board concentrated on difficult but  non-controversial commodity problems. As the war ended its commodity committees were enlarged to include representatives of other nations. The Board closed down at the end of December 1945.

Mission
Roosevelt and Churchill set the Board's mission as:
a. Be composed of a representative of the British Government and a representative of the U.S. Government. The British member will represent and act under the instruction of the Minister of Supply.
b. Plan the best and speediest development, expansion and use of the raw material resources under the jurisdiction or control of the two Governments, and make the recommendations necessary to execute such plans. Such recommendations shall be carried out by all parts of the respective Governments.
c. In collaboration with others of the United Nations work toward the best utilisation of their raw material resources, and, in collaboration with the interested nation or nations, formulate plans and recommendations for the development, expansion, purchase, or other effective use of their raw materials.

The leaders were  William L. Batt from the U.S. and Sir Clive Baillieu (both in Washington) and Lord Beaverbrook in London.

Activities
The Board was a coordinating body.  In February 1943 it set up a Combined Copper Board and in March 1943 it set up a new Combined Rubber Committee.

See also
 Combined Food Board
 Combined Production and Resources Board
 Military production during World War II

Notes

Further reading
 
 Gordon, R. A. "International Programming of the Distribution of Resources: A Symposium: III. the Combined Raw Materials Board." Journal of the American Statistical Association (1944) 39#227 pp: 291-296. in JSTOR
 Livermore, Shaw. "International Control of Raw Materials." The Annals of the American Academy of Political and Social Science (1951): 157-165. in JSTOR
 Rosen, S. McKee. The combined boards of the Second World War: An experiment in international administration (Columbia University Press, 1951)
 Wendt, Paul. "The control of rubber in World War II." Southern Economic Journal (1947): 203-227. IN jstor

United Kingdom–United States relations
Military logistics of World War II